Anthony Noto (born 2 May 1968) is an American businessman, the CEO of SoFi, and the former COO of Twitter.

Previously, he was a managing director at Goldman Sachs, CFO of the National Football League, COO of Twitter, and head of Twitter Ventures.

Early life and education
Anthony Noto is the son of Roseanne Niet (who died in 2015) and George Noto Sr. He has two siblings, George Noto and Thomas Noto. His brother Thomas died in 2018. He has 5 children with his wife, Kristin Noto. Noto graduated from Franklin D. Roosevelt High School in Hyde Park, New York. He attended the United States Military Academy at West Point, where he was a star linebacker on the football team, earning All-East and Academic All-American honors.  In 1991, Noto was the highest-ranked mechanical engineering major in his graduating class. After graduating from Army Ranger School at Fort Benning, Noto served as a Communications Officer with the 24th Infantry Division in Fort Stewart, Georgia.

After serving in the military, Noto attended business school at the University of Chicago, while working at Kraft Foods as a brand manager, and later received an MBA from the Wharton School of Business in 1999.

Career

Goldman Sachs and NFL
Noto joined Goldman Sachs in 1999 and was voted the top analyst by Institutional Investor magazine for research on the Internet industry. Noto led the firm’s communications, media and entertainment research team at Goldman Sachs, and provided strategic direction and resource allocation for the group.  He became a managing director in 2003, and a partner in 2004.

On 24 February 2008, Noto took over the job of CFO for the National Football League, a position left vacant since former CFO, Barbara Kaczynski, left in February 2003. Noto held the position until October 2010, but left just prior to the negotiations which led up to the 2011 lockout.  He returned to Goldman Sachs in October 2010 as the co-head of Goldman’s global media group.  In 2013, Noto helped Goldman score one of the "biggest tech prizes around" when the company won the role of lead underwriter for Twitter's initial public offering. Noto would work as the main banker dealing with Twitter.

Coatue and Twitter
In May 2014, Noto announced that he would be leaving Goldman Sachs to join the New York-based hedge fund Coatue Management LLC. However, on 1 July 2014, Twitter CEO Dick Costolo announced that Noto would join Twitter as the company's CFO.  The two men built a good relationship the previous year when Noto managed Twitter's account while at Goldman Sachs. In 2014, Noto received total compensation of $73 million.

SoFi
On January 20, 2018, it was confirmed that Noto was leaving Twitter to become the CEO of SoFi (Social Finance, Inc.).

References

1968 births
Living people
People from Poughkeepsie, New York
Army Black Knights football players
United States Military Academy alumni
Military personnel from New York (state)
United States Army officers
United States Army Rangers
Wharton School of the University of Pennsylvania alumni
Businesspeople from Poughkeepsie, New York
American computer businesspeople
American investment bankers
American chief financial officers
Businesspeople in information technology
Twitter, Inc. people
American chief operating officers
21st-century American businesspeople